Formaela is a hard cheese produced exclusively in Arachova, Greece. It is famous throughout Greece and has been registered in the European Union as a protected designation of origin since 1996.

Formaela is prepared mainly from sheep's or goat's milk, has a hard and cohesive shell and is a light yellow color, without holes. It has a particularly pungent taste, and is usually consumed grilled or fried. Its chemical composition is: maximum moisture content of 38%, a minimum fat content of 40%.

See also

 List of cheeses

References 

Goat's-milk cheeses
Sheep's-milk cheeses
Greek cheeses
Greek products with protected designation of origin